The Terra Nova locomotive is a diesel-hydraulic locomotive used mainly for heavy shunting operations and light line service. It is produced at Electroputere VFU-Reloc Craiova, Romania and it had its official launching in May 2014, having four axles and the possibility to be adapted to all types of gauges.

History
SC. RELOC SA and Electroputere VFU became part of Grampet Group in 2013, being responsible for the part of construction of new innovative locomotives, research, design of new products and sustainable technologies,  but also repairing, manufacturing, modernization of existing locomotives. Since 2014, it has started to produce the Terra Nova locomotive, its future plans for 2015-2018 being to build a new  diesel electric locomotive and a new  electric locomotive.

References

External links 

Diesel locomotives
Locomotives of Romania
Railway locomotives introduced in 2014